Cecidocharella is a genus of tephritid  or fruit flies in the family Tephritidae.

Species
Cecidocharella elegans Hendel, 1936

References

Tephritinae
Tephritidae genera
Diptera of South America